Mahmoud Abdel-Aty is an Egyptian professor of mathematics and information science at Sohag University and the Mathematics Department at Zewail City of Science, Technology and Innovation. He is an elected fellow and the former North Africa Vice President of the African Academy of Sciences, the President of the Egyptian National Committee for the International Mathematical Union, and the Director of the Center for International Relations at Sohag University.

Early life and education 

Mahmoud Abdel-Aty was born on 6 November 1967. He obtained his first degree B.Sc. Excellent with Honor, in 1990 from Assiut University, Egypt. He received his Master of Science degree in applied mathematics from Assiut University in 1995. He received his Ph.D. in Applied Mathematics and Quantum Information from Max Planck Institute of Quantum Optics in 1999 and received his D.Sc. in mathematics and physics from the National University of Uzbekistan in 2007.

Career 

Mahmoud Abdel-Aty started his career as an assistant lecturer at Assiut University (1990-1995). He was a lecturer at South Valley University in 1995 until 1997, when he left to pursue his doctorate at Max Planck Institute of Quantum Optics, Munich.  He became an assistant professor in 1999 at South Valley University. After a postdoctoral position at Flensburg University from 2001 to 2003, he became an associate professor at South Valley University in 2004. He became a full professor at Sohag University in 2009. He was the founding chairman of Applied Mathematics Department, at Zewail City of Science and Technology (2013-2017). In 2017, he became the Dean of Scientific Research and Graduate Studies at Applied Science University, Bahrain and from  2018 till present, he is the Director of the International Relation Center, at Sohag University.

Awards and honours 

In 2003, Abdel-Aty received the State Encouragement Award for Mathematics. In 2005, he received the  Third World Academy of Science Award in Mathematics. In 2007 he collected the Abdul Hameed Shoman Foundation Award for Arab Researchers in Mathematics and Computer SciencesIn 2009, he was awarded the Fayza Al-Kharafi Prize in Physics by the Egyptian Academy of Sciences and Technology. In 2011, he received the State Award for Excellence in Basic Science by the Egyptian Academy of Sciences and Technology.

In 2018, he received  Mohamed bin Rashed Prize for the best initiative in language policy and planning offered by Mohamed bin Rashed Foundation.

References 

Living people
20th-century Egyptian mathematicians
1967 births
National University of Uzbekistan alumni
Fellows of the African Academy of Sciences
21st-century Egyptian mathematicians